Belaya is a rural locality (a village) in Kargopolsky District, Arkhangelsk Oblast, Russia. The population was 23 as of 2012. There are 2 streets.

Geography 
Belaya is located 40 km south of Kargopol (the district's administrative centre) by road. Timoshinskaya is the nearest rural locality.

References 

Rural localities in Kargopolsky District